Porphyra cinnamomea is a red alga species in the genus Porphyra, known from New Zealand. It is monostromatic, monoecious, and grows in the intertidal zone, predominantly on rock substrata. With P. coleana, P. rakiura and P. virididentata, they can be distinguished by morphology (such as the microscopic arrangement of cells along their thallus margin, their thallus shape, size and colour), as well as geographical, ecological and seasonal distribution patterns, and importantly, chromosome numbers, which in this species n = 3. Finally, these four species are distinguished by a particular nucleotide sequence at the 18S rDNA locus.

References

Further reading
Nelson, W. A., J. E. Broom, and T. J. Farr. "Pyrophyllon and Chlidophyllon (Erythropeltidales, Rhodophyta): two new genera for obligate epiphytic species previously placed in Porphyra, and a discussion of the orders Erythropeltidales and Bangiales." Phycologia 42.3 (2003): 308–315.
Schweikert, Katja, et al. "Analysis of spatial and temporal diversity and distribution of porphyra (rhodophyta) in southeastern new zealand supported by the use of molecular tools1." Journal of phycology 48.3 (2012): 530–538.
Schweikert, Katja, et al. "Regulation of polyamine metabolism in Pyropia cinnamomea (WA Nelson), an important mechanism for reducing UV‐B‐induced oxidative damage." Journal of Phycology 50.2 (2014): 267–279.

External links

AlgaeBase
WORMS

Species described in 2001
Bangiophyceae